Phosphide bromides or bromide phosphides are compounds containing anions composed of bromide (Br−) and phosphide (P3−) anions. Usually phosphorus is covalently connected into more complex structures. They can be considered as mixed anion compounds. They are in the category of pnictidehalides. Related compounds include the phosphide chlorides, phosphide iodides, nitride bromides, arsenide bromides, and antimonide bromides.

List

References

Phosphides
Mixed anion compounds
Bromides